The economy of Ecuador is the eighth largest in Latin America and the 69th largest in the world by total GDP. Ecuador's economy is based on the export of oil, bananas, shrimp, gold, other primary agricultural products and money transfers from Ecuadorian emigrants employed abroad.  In 2017, remittances constituted 2.7% of country's GDP. The total trade amounted to 42% of the Ecuador's GDP in 2017.

The country is substantially dependent on its petroleum resources. In 2017, oil accounted for about one-third of public-sector revenue and 32% of export earnings. When Ecuador was part of OPEC, it was one of the smallest members and produced about 531,300 barrels per day of petroleum in 2017. It is the world's largest exporter of bananas ($3.38 billion in 2017) and a major exporter of shrimp ($3.06 billion in 2017). Exports of non-traditional products such as cut flowers ($846 million in 2017) and canned fish ($1.18 billion in 2017) have grown in recent years.

In the past, Ecuador's economy depended largely on primary industries like agriculture, petroleum, and aquaculture. As a result of shifts in global market trends and development of technology, the country has experienced economic development in other sectors, such as textiles, processed food, metallurgy and the service sectors. Between 2006 and 2014, GDP growth averaged 4.3%, driven by high oil prices and external financing. From 2015 until 2018, GDP growth averaged just 0.6%. Ecuador's ex-president, Lenín Moreno, launched a radical transformation of Ecuador's economy after taking office in May 2017. The aim was to increase the private sector's weight, in particular the oil industry.

Agriculture

Ecuador is one of the 10 largest producers in the world of banana, cocoa and palm oil.
 
In 2018, the country produced 7.5 million tons of sugarcane, 6.5 million tons of banana (6th largest producer in the world), 2.7 million tons of palm oil (6th largest producer in the world), 1.3 million tons of maize, 1.3 million tons of rice, 269 thousand tons of potato, 235 thousand tons of cocoa (7th largest producer in the world), 149 thousand tons of pineapple, 103 thousand tons of orange, in addition to smaller productions of other agricultural products.

Mining 

In 2019, the country had an annual production of about 1 ton of antimony (14th largest producer in the world).

In 2006, Ecuador had an annual production of about 5.3 tonnes of gold, being the 34th largest producer in the world at the time. Ecuador produced 8.6 tons of gold in 2013, which was the absolute record between 2006 and 2017. In 2017, production was 7.3 tons.

In terms of silver production, Ecuador produced 1 ton in 2017, which is the country's usual average.

In 2019, in the north of Ecuador, a large deposit of gold, silver and copper was discovered.

Industries 
Oil accounts for 40% of exports and contributes to maintaining a positive trade balance. Since the late '60s, the exploitation of oil increased production and reserves are estimated at 4.036 million barrels

In the agricultural sector, Ecuador is a major exporter of bananas (the largest exporter of bananas in the world), cut flowers, cacao, coffee, shrimp, wood, and fish. It is also significant in shrimp production, sugar cane, rice, cotton, corn, palm and coffee. The country's vast resources include large amounts of timber across the country, like eucalyptus and mangroves. Pines and cedars are planted in the region of the Sierra, walnuts and rosemary, and balsa wood, on Guayas River Basin.

Ecuador's tobacco is prized in the cigar industry due to the prolonged cloud cover and rich volcanic soil creating ideal growing conditions, especially for shade tobacco and Ecuadorian Sumatra Tobacco cigar wrapper leaves; exports topped $70M in 2018.

The industry is concentrated mainly in Guayaquil, the largest industrial center, and in Quito, where in recent years the industry has grown considerably.  This city is also the largest business center of the country. Industrial production is directed primarily to the domestic market. Despite this, there is limited export of products produced or processed industrially. These include canned foods, liquor, jewelry, furniture, and more. Minor industrial activity is also concentrated in Cuenca.

The dairy industry is represented by companies such as Tonicorp, which is owned by the Coca Cola Company.

Trade

The overall trade balance for August 2012 was a surplus of almost 390 million dollars for the first six months of 2012, a huge figure compared with that of 2007, which reached only $5.7 million; the surplus had risen by about 425 million compared to 2006. This circumstance was due to the fact that imports grew faster than exports. The oil trade balance positive had revenues of $3.295 million in 2008, while non-oil was negative amounting to 2.842 million dollars.. The trade balance was positive in 2019 and 2020 with 2.05 billion dollars and 6.4 billion dollars. In 2016, the trade balance was positive (608 million dollars) but negative in 2017 (-723 million dollars) and 2018 (1.41 billion dollars). The trade balance with Argentina, Colombia and Asia is negative.

Ecuador has negotiated bilateral treaties with other countries, besides belonging to the Andean Community of Nations, and an associate member of Mercosur. It also belongs to the World Trade Organization (WTO), in addition to the Inter-American Development Bank (IDB), World Bank, International Monetary Fund (IMF), Corporacion Andina de Fomento (CAF) and other multilateral agencies. In April 2007, Ecuador paid off its debt to the IMF thus ending an era of interventionism of the Agency in the country.  The public finance of Ecuador consists of the Central Bank of Ecuador (BCE), the National Development Bank (BNF), the State Bank, the National Finance Corporation, the Ecuadorian Housing Bank (BEV) and the Ecuadorian Educational Loans and Grants.

Economic history 

Deteriorating economic performance in 1997–98 culminated in a severe financial crisis in 1999. The crisis was precipitated by a number of external shocks, including the El Niño weather phenomenon in 1997, a sharp drop in global oil prices in 1997–98, and international emerging market instability in 1997–98. These factors highlighted the Government of Ecuador's unsustainable economic policy mix of large fiscal deficits and expansionary money policy and resulted in a 7.3% contraction of GDP, annual year-on-year inflation of 52.2%, and a 65% devaluation of the national currency in 1999.

On January 9, 2000, the administration of President Jamil Mahuad announced its intention to adopt the U.S. dollar as the official currency of Ecuador to address the ongoing economic crisis. Subsequent protest led to the 2000 Ecuadorean coup d'état which saw Mahuad's removal from office and the elevation of Vice President Gustavo Noboa to the presidency.

US Dollar has been the only official currency of Ecuador since the year 2000.

The Noboa government confirmed its commitment to convert to the dollar as the centerpiece of its economic recovery strategy, successfully completing the transition from sucres to dollars in 2001. Following the completion of a one-year stand-by program with the International Monetary Fund (IMF) in December 2001, Ecuador successfully negotiated a new $205 million stand-by agreement with the IMF in March 2003.

Buoyed by higher oil prices, the Ecuadorian economy experienced a modest recovery in 2000–01, with GDP rising 2.3% in 2000 and 5.4% in 2001. GDP growth leveled off to 2.7% in 2002. Inflation fell from an annual rate of 96.1% in 2000 to an annual rate of 37.7% in 2001; 12.6% for 2002.

The completion of the second Transandean Oil Pipeline (OCP in Spanish) in 2003 enabled Ecuador to expand oil exports. The OCP will double Ecuador's oil transport capacity.

Ecuador's economy is the eighth largest in Latin America and experienced an average growth of 4.6% per year between 2000 and 2006. In January 2009, the Central Bank of Ecuador (BCE) put the 2010 growth forecast at 6.88%. GDP doubled between 1999 and 2007, reaching 65,490 million dollars according to BCE.
Inflation rate up to January 2008 was located about 1.14%, the highest recorded in the last year, according to Government. The monthly unemployment rate remained at about 6 and 8 percent from December 2007 until September 2008, however, it went up to about 9 percent in October and dropped again in November 2008 to 8 percent.

Between 2006 and 2009, the government increased spending on social welfare and education from 2.6% to 5.2% of its GDP.  Starting in 2007, when its economy was surpassed by the economic crisis, Ecuador was subject to a number of economic policy reforms by the government that have helped steer the Ecuadorian economy to a sustained, substantial, and focused achievement of financial stability and consistent social policy.  Such policies were expansionary fiscal policies, of access to housing finance, stimulus packs, and limiting the amount of money reserves banks could keep abroad. The Ecuadorian government has made huge investments in education and infrastructure throughout the nation, which have improved the lives of the poor.

On December 12, 2008 President Rafael Correa announced that Ecuador would not pay $30.6m in interest to lenders of a $510m loan, claiming that they were monsters.  In addition it claimed that $3.8bn in foreign debt negotiated by previous administrations was illegitimate because it was authorized without executive decree. At the time of the announcement, the country had $5.65bn in cash reserves.

In 2009, economic growth declined to 0.6% during the global recession, accompanied by falling oil prices and a decline in remittances provided by Ecuadorians living and working abroad (a major source of external revenues). Showing signs of recovery in 2010, the economy rebounded and grew by 2.8%. After growth of 7.4% in 2011, Ecuador's growth averaged 4.5% from 2012 to 2014.

Some observers have attributed the high growth to a public investment boom that was fueled by high oil prices and lending from China. According to the U.S. Energy Information Administration, Ecuador was the third largest source of foreign oil to the western United States in 2014. However, in the middle of 2014 after the price of oil declined significantly, Ecuador's oil earnings fell. As a consequence, the Economist Intelligence Unit (EIU) forecast that Ecuador's economy would contract slightly in 2015, although the economy ultimately grew by less than half a percent. President Correa's plans to begin extracting crude oil from the Ishpingo, Tambochoa, and Tiputini field in Yasuní National Park in the Amazon to provide an economic boost did not salvage the economy from going into recession. In 2016, Ecuador's gross domestic product contracted by 1.6%.

Ecuador's economic slowdown in 2016 and the country's need for external finance were exacerbated by a deadly April 2016 earthquake. Ecuador's estimated $3 billion costs for reconstruction and humanitarian assistance for 720,000 people in the affected region remain a burden that the government and private sector have sought to address. In response, the U.S. Office of Foreign Disaster Assistance provided more than $3 million in assistance, including provisions airlifted in for 50,000 people in the earthquake-prone region and assistance with water and sanitation systems in affected areas. A U.N. appeal by the Office of Coordination of Humanitarian Assistance sought to raise $73 million. However, as of July 2016, only one-fifth of this amount had been received from donor countries, including the United States.

The Correa government increased a value-added tax and implemented a plan to further cut government expenditures after cutting capital expenditures by 30%. Despite President Correa's reluctance to ask for assistance from the International Monetary Fund (IMF), the IMF approved a request for $364 million in financial support under its Rapid Financing Instrument in early July 2016 for Ecuador. Additional loans from China and the World Bank to help ease the government's balance-of-payments needs were considered.

Ecuador's access to global financial markets also had been limited by its 2008 default on $3.2 billion in debt to global lenders. Consequently, the Correa government turned to nontraditional allies, such as China, for external finance. From 2005 to 2014, Chinese banks provided almost $11 billion of financing to Ecuador. The Correa government also asked China for an additional $7.5 billion in financing in early 2015 as crude oil prices—the nation's biggest export—weakened further. China agreed to the financing request and began to disburse funding, including nearly $1 billion in May and June 2015. Ecuador successfully returned to the international capital market in June 2014 with a $2 billion bond issue followed by additional smaller bond issues in 2015. President Moreno later discovered loans made by China over the years currently require that Ecuador pay China back with almost 500 barrels of crude oil—or roughly three years of the country's oil production. According to press reports, some private sector analysts question whether Ecuador will be able to meet its debt obligations given two strains on the country's public finances: the slump in oil income due to the commodity's low price and the strong U.S. dollar, which, as a result of Ecuador's dollarized economy, makes the country's exports less globally competitive.

Ecuador withdrew from efforts to develop a regional free trade agreement (FTA) between the United States and Bolivia, Colombia, Ecuador, and Peru in 2006. The United States subsequently signed bilateral FTAs with Peru and Colombia, but Ecuador showed no interest in pursuing an FTA with the United States. Following Venezuela's acceptance in 2012 to full membership in the South American customs union, Mercosur (Mercado Común del Sur or Common Market of the South), the leftist governments in Bolivia and Ecuador applied to move from observer status to full membership in the trade bloc originally composed of Argentina, Brazil, Paraguay, and Uruguay. According to some observers, out of a concern for Ecuador's struggling non-oil exporters, Correa embraced a trade agreement with the European Union (EU) as part of the EU-Andean Community Association agreement that went into effect in January 2017.

The International Monetary Fund approved an agreement with Ecuador in March 2019. This arrangement would provide support ($10 billion) for the Ecuadorian government's economic policies over three years (2018-2021 Prosperity Plan).

Poverty and inequality 
, an estimated 9 million Ecuadorians have an economic occupation and about 1.01 million inhabitants are in unemployment condition.
In 1998, 10% of the richest population had 42.5% of income, while 10% of the poor had only 0.6% of income. The rates of poverty were higher for populations of indigenous, afro-descendents, and rural sectors. During the same year, 7.6% of health spending went to the 20% of the poor, while 20% of the rich population received 38.1% of this expenditure. The extreme poverty rate has declined significantly between 1999 and 2010. In 2001 it was estimated at 40% of the population, while by 2011 the figure dropped to 17.4% of the total population. This is explained largely by emigration and economic stability achieved after adopting the U.S dollar as official means of transaction . Poverty rates were higher for indigenous peoples, Afro-descendants and rural areas, reaching 44% of the Native ancestry population.

Infrastructure development
The industrial sector has had enormous difficulty to emerge significantly. The industrial sector's main problem is the deficit of energy, which the current government has tackled with the improvement of performance on existing hydro plants, and the creation of new ones. Such projects included negotiation of the Coca-Codo hydroplant. Incentives of financing, tributary incentives, tariffs, and others will be implemented, that is intended to benefit areas of tourism, food processing, renewable and alternative energy sources, bioenergies, pharmaceutical and chemical products, biochemical and environmental biomedecine, services, automotive metallurgical industry, footwear, and automotive parts and pieces, among others. A 500 kV transmission line increases national grid strength and electricity trade with Peru and Colombia.

Statistics

Main economic indicators 
The following table shows the main economic indicators in 1980–2019 (with IMF staff stimtates in 2020-2025). Inflation below 5% is in green.

See also 

 Banking in Ecuador
 Economy of South America
 Economic history of Ecuador
 Ecuador Census
 China–Ecuador relations
 Latin American economy
 List of Latin American and Caribbean countries by GDP growth
 List of Latin American and Caribbean countries by GDP (nominal)
 List of Latin American and Caribbean countries by GDP (PPP)

References

Further reading

External links
World Bank Summary Trade Statistics Ecuador
 
Tariffs applied by Ecuador as provided by ITC's Market Access Map, an online database of customs tariffs and market requirements.

 Electricity grid map
 Solar insolation maps

 
Ecuador
Ecuador